The Singapore national under-23 football team is the national under-23 association football team of Singapore. The team comes under the organisation of the Football Association of Singapore (FAS).

Players are mostly selected from the S.League team Young Lions.

Tournament records

Olympic Games

 Since 1992, football at the Summer Olympics changes into Under-23 tournament.

AFC U-23 Championship

Asian Games

 Since 2002, football at the Asian Games changes into Under-23 tournament.

SEA Games

 Since 2001, Football at the Southeast Asian Games changes into Under-23 tournament.
*Denotes draws include knockout matches decided on penalty kicks.
**Red border color indicates tournament was held on home soil.

<div style="text-align:left">

*Win on penalty kicks.

Recent results

2014
2014 Hassanal Bolkiah Trophy

2015
2015 Bangabandhu Cup
 

Friendly

Football at the 2015 Southeast Asian Games

2016
2016 AFC U-23 Championship qualification

Friendly

2017
Friendly

Dubai International Cup

2018 AFC U-23 Championship qualification

2017 Southeast Asian Games

2018 
Friendly

2018 Hassanal Bolkiah Trophy

2019
Friendly

2020 AFC U-23 Championship qualification
 

 

 

Merlion Cup

2019 Southeast Asian Games

2021
Friendly

2022 AFC U-23 Asian Cup qualification

2022
2022 AFF U-23 Youth Championship

Friendly

2021 Southeast Asian Games

2023
Merlion Cup (24-26 March)

2023 Southeast Asian Games (29 April - 17 May)

2024 AFC U-23 Asian Cup qualification (4-12 September) 

2022 Asian Games (23 September - 8 October) 

2023 AFF U-23 Youth Championship

Current coaching staff

Players

Current squad
The following 28 players were selected for the 2023 Merlion Cup.

Caps and goals updated as of 14 May 2022, after the match against .

Recent call-ups
The following players have also been called up in the last 12 months to the Singapore squad.

 
 
 
 

 
 
 
 
 
 
 
 
 
 
 

 
 
 
 
 
 
 
 
 
 
 

 
 
 
 
 

 INJ Withdrew due to an injury
 PRE Preliminary squad 
 OA Overage player

Honours

Regional
 Southeast Asian Games
  Bronze medal (3): 2007, 2009 and 2013
 Merlion Cup
  Champions (1): 2019
 Pestabola Merdeka
  Third Place (1): 2013

See also
 Singapore national football team
 Singapore national youth football team
 Young Lions
 Singapore women's national football team

References

Asian national under-23 association football teams
u23